Drunken Master III is a 1994 Hong Kong martial arts film directed by Lau Kar-leung and starring Andy Lau, Michelle Reis, Willie Chi, Simon Yam, Lau Kar-leung, Adam Cheng and Gordon Liu. This film was quickly produced after director Lau and Jackie Chan fell out on the set of Drunken Master II with the style of action and Lau decided to produce a more authentic entry in the Drunken Master film series. Despite the title, Drunken Master III is not a sequel to the Drunken Master film series and is widely considered an imitator.

Plot
At the turn of the century of China, the White Lotus Society plots to put the sinister Manchu Emperor Yuan Shikai (William Ho) to become the Emperor of China. However, he needs to be given a Jade Ring possessed by his fiancé, Princess Sum-yuk (Michelle Reis). The White Lotus Society gets Yeung Kwan (Andy Lau) to get the princess. However, Yeung is actually a rebel leader working for Sun Yat-sen and he abducts Sum-yuk and find refuge at the Po Chi Lam clinic owned by Wong Kei-ying (Adam Cheng) with his mischievous son, Wong Fei-hung (Willie Chi). Later, Fei-hung gets involved with Yeung and Sum-yuk and end up on the run together. Along the way, Fei-hung later learns the secrets of Drunken Boxing from an old master, Uncle Yan (Lau Kar-leung).

Cast
Andy Lau as Yeung Kwan
Michelle Reis as Princess Sum-yuk
Willie Chi as Wong Fei-hung
Simon Yam as Gay bus passenger
Lau Kar-leung as Uncle Yan
Adam Cheng as Wong Kei-ying
Gordon Liu as Governor Lee
William Ho as Yuan Shikai
Jimmy Lau
Woo Kin-keung
Lee Kwok-man
Daniel Chan
Zhang Lei
Brad Allan as Bus passenger
Lau Heung-yeung
Ma Lee-hung
Luk Lan-fung
Chow Man-wai
To Man-hung
Sze Sui-fan
Fong Wai-chung
Chou Jing
Hon Man-kit
Hau Chan-yu
Luk Siu-pang
Giorgio Pasotti as White Lotus Clan Leader
Chow Man
Chin Hiu-kwan
Kwok Nai-ming
Zhang Teng
Suen Ka-wing
Tsui Fai
Cheung Yiu-man

Reception

LoveHKFilm gave the film a negative review: "What looked like it could be a semi-fun Hong Kong flick completely devolves after 30 minutes, turning the proceedings into a banal, mind-numbingly tedious series of fights, hijinks, and unnecessary dialogue."

Box office
The film grossed HK$7,076,791 in its theatrical from 2 to 20 July 1994 in Hong Kong.

See also
Andy Lau filmography
Wong Fei-hung filmography

References

External links

Drunken Master III at Hong Kong Cinemagic

Drunken Master III film review at LoveHKFilm.com

1994 films
1994 action films
1994 martial arts films
Hong Kong action comedy films
Hong Kong martial arts films
Kung fu films
Wushu films
1990s martial arts comedy films
Films about rebels
1990s Cantonese-language films
Films directed by Lau Kar-leung
Films set in the Republic of China (1912–1949)
Cultural depictions of Sun Yat-sen
Films about cults
1990s Hong Kong films